William Edward Whitehouse (20 May 1859 – 12 January 1935) was an English cellist.

Career
He studied for one year with Alfredo Piatti, for whom he deputised (taking his place in concerts when called upon), and was his favourite pupil. He went on to teach at the Royal Academy of Music, Royal College of Music and King's College, Cambridge; his students included Felix Salmond and Beatrice Harrison, who both became closely associated with Edward Elgar. He played with violinist Joseph Joachim, and formed The London Trio with violinist Achille Simonetti and pianist Amina Goodwin. He edited Piatti's Caprices, with suggestions as to how his former teacher preferred them to be played.

External links
 William Whitehouse
 The Violoncello and the Romantic Era: 1820-1920: Part II — A Survey of Current Cello Teachers on Romantic Repertoire and Aesthetics

1859 births
1935 deaths
20th-century classical musicians
Academics of the Royal Academy of Music
Academics of the Royal College of Music
English cellists
20th-century cellists